Christa B. Fouché is a New Zealand social work academic. She is currently professor of social work at the University of Auckland. Her work has covered people living with medical conditions such as HIV/AIDS and Alzheimer's disease.

Fouché's PhD from the Rand Afrikaans University (now the University of Johannesburg) looked at training social workers to serve with black South Africans with HIV/AIDS.

Selected works 
 Strydom, H., C. B. Fouche, and C. S. L. Delport. "Research at grass roots: for the social sciences and human service professions." Pretoria: VanSchaik Publishers (2002).
 Fouché, C. B., and W. Schurink. "Qualitative research designs." Research at grass roots: For the social sciences and human service professions 3 (2005): 267–273.

References

External links
 google scholar 
 institutional homepage

Living people
New Zealand women academics
University of Johannesburg alumni
Academic staff of the University of Auckland
New Zealand social workers
Year of birth missing (living people)
New Zealand women writers